Lograto is a town and comune in the province of Brescia, in Lombardy. Neighbouring communes are Azzano Mella, Torbole Casaglia, Travagliato, Berlingo, Maclodio and Mairano. It is located in a plain southwest of Brescia.

References

Cities and towns in Lombardy